The JBoss Enterprise SOA Platform (or JBoss SOA Platform) is free software/open-source Java EE-based service-oriented architecture (SOA) software. The JBoss Enterprise SOA Platform is part of the JBoss Enterprise Middleware portfolio of software. The JBoss Enterprise SOA Platform enables enterprises to integrate services, handle business events, and automate business processes, linking IT resources, data, services and applications. Because it is Java-based, the JBoss application server operates cross-platform: usable on any operating system that supports Java. The JBoss SOA Platform was developed by JBoss, now a division of Red Hat.

Product features and components
 Business rules engine
 JBoss jBPM
 JBoss Enterprise Service Bus (JBossESB)
 Event management and complex event processing (CEP)
 Event-driven architecture (EDA)
 Data integration
 Service-oriented architecture (SOA) services
 HornetQ
 JBoss Enterprise Application Platform (JBoss EAP)
 Java Enterprise Edition (JEE) services
 Computer clustering
 Java Connector Architecture (JCA)

Enterprise Service Bus (ESB)
The JBoss Enterprise Service Bus (JBossESB, or JBoss ESB) software is part of the JBoss Enterprise SOA Platform. The software is Enterprise Application Integration (EAI) or business integration software. In general, enterprise service bus (ESB) software is used to map the Service-Oriented Infrastructure (SOI) and Service-Oriented Architecture (SOA) concepts onto a concrete implementation. The software is middleware used to connect systems together, especially non-interoperable systems. The software contains the following:
 Business process monitoring
 Integrated Development Environment (IDE)
 Human workflow user interface
 Business Process Management (BPM)
 Connectors
 Transaction manager
 Security
 Application containers
 Messaging services
 Metadata repository
 Naming and directory service
 Distributed Computing Architecture (DCA)

Enterprise Data Services Platform (EDSP)
The JBoss Enterprise Data Services Platform (JBoss EDSP) is data virtualization software, a superset of the JBoss Enterprise SOA Platform. The JBoss EDSP uses the enterprise service bus (ESB) software JBoss Enterprise Service Bus (JBossESB). The JBoss EDSP includes:
 tools for creating data views that are accessible through standard protocols
 a repository for storing metadata
 a runtime environment for data integrity and security

Licensing and pricing 
JBoss itself is open source, but Red Hat charges to provide a support subscription for JBoss Enterprise Middleware.

See also

 List of JBoss software
 Comparison of business integration software

References

Bibliography

External links
 JBoss application server website
  Securing JBoss
 JBoss Wiki
 JBoss Community Projects
 JBoss Introduction by Javid Jamae

Java enterprise platform
Red Hat software
Cross-platform software
Service-oriented architecture-related products
Enterprise application integration